Tarteletto–Isorex is a Belgian UCI Continental team founded in 2010.

Team roster

Major wins
2011
Ronde van Noord-Holland, Niels Wytinck
GP Impanis-Van Petegem, Sander Cordeel
2012
Flèche Ardennaise, Clement Lhotellerie
2017
Overall Tour of Iran (Azerbaijan), Rob Ruijgh
2019
Prologue Tour d'Egypte, Polychronis Tzortzakis
Stage 2 Tour du Maroc, Abram Stockman
Stages 7 & 8 Tour du Maroc, Polychronis Tzortzakis
Internationale Wielertrofee Jong Maar Moedig, Julien Van den Brande
Overall In the steps of Romans, Polychronis Tzortzakis
Stage 1, Polychronis Tzortzakis
Stage 5 Tour of Azerbaijan (Iran), Thomas Joseph
2021 
Dorpenomloop Rucphen, Elias Van Breussegem
2022
Stage 5 Belgrade Banjaluka, Andreas Goeman
Stage 3 International Tour of Hellas, Lennert Teugels

Major results
2019
 Greece Time Trial, Polychronis Tzortzakis
 Albania Time Trial, Ylber Sefa
 Albania Road Race, Ylber Sefa
2020
 Albania Time Trial, Ylber Sefa
 Albania Road Race, Ylber Sefa
2021
 Albania Time Trial, Ylber Sefa
 Albania Road Race, Ylber Sefa

References

External links

UCI Continental Teams (Europe)
Cycling teams based in Belgium
Cycling teams established in 2010